The Italian general election of 1948 took place on 18 April 1948.

The election was a triumph for Christian Democracy (DC), which won a thumping 60.5% throughout Veneto. The party did better in its traditional strongholds, Vicenza (71.8%), Padua (65.4%) and Treviso (64.9%). The Italian Socialist Party (PSI) and the Italian Communist Party (PCI), which formed a joint list named Popular Democratic Front (FDP), won just 23.9% of the vote. Apart from Rovigo, where the FDP gained 48.2%, many Socialist votes went to DC and the Italian Democratic Socialist Party (PSDI), an outfit formed by those Socialists who had been opposed to the alliance with the Communists. The PSDI garnered 10.1% of the vote at the regional level, one of the highest tallies among regions, and was stronger in Belluno (15.9%), Treviso (12.6%) and Verona (10.1%).

Results

Chamber of Deputies
Source: Regional Council of Veneto

Provincial breakdown
Source: Regional Council of Veneto

Senate
Source: Regional Council of Veneto

Elections in Veneto
General, Veneto